Sam Hill is an American television director and television producer. He is best known for his directing and producing work on the television series CSI: Miami. His other directing credits include CSI: NY, Cult, Body of Proof, Almost Human, Believe, Forever and Scorpion.

Prior to working in television, Hill worked as a film assistant director, most notably on the films Cruel Intentions (1999), Cruel Intentions 2 (2001) and The Sweetest Thing (2002), all of which were directed by Roger Kumble.

References

External links

American film directors
American television directors
American television producers
Living people
Place of birth missing (living people)
Year of birth missing (living people)